The Royal Swedish Society of Naval Sciences (KÖMS), founded in 1771 by King Gustav III, is one of the Royal Academies in Sweden. The Society is an independent organization and a forum for navy and defence issues. Fellowship is limited to 120 chairs under the age of 60.

Chairmen

1826–1827: Johan Lagerbielke
1832–1837: Carl August Gyllengranat
1838–1844: Carl August Gyllengranat
1857–1858: Carl August Gyllengranat
1923–1928: Ulf Carl Sparre
1929–1933: Charles de Champs
1934–1936: Claës Lindsström
1936–1938: Gunnar Bjurner
1939–1942: Hans Simonsson
1943–1949: Gösta Ehrensvärd
1950–1958: Erik Samuelson
1958–1961: Sigurd Lagerman
1961–1963: Bertil Berthelsson
1963–1966: Stig Bergelin
1966–1969: Dag Arvas
1969–1970: Åke Lindemalm
1970–1978: Bengt Lundvall
1979–1984: Bengt Rasin
1983–1986: Jan Enquist
1987–1992: Bror Stefenson
1992–2000: Claes Tornberg
2000–2002: Bertil Björkman
2002–2005: Göran Larsbrink
2005–2010: Leif Nylander
2010–2014: Thomas Engevall
2014–2018: Michael Zell
2018–present: Anders Grenstad

See also 
Society and Defense
Swedish Navy

External links 

1771 establishments in Sweden
Naval Sciences
Military of Sweden
1771 in Sweden
Military-related organizations